Quentin Daubin (born 3 July 1995) is a French professional footballer who plays for Caen as a midfielder.

Career
After coming through the youth system at Chamois Niortais, Daubin was handed his senior debut on 14 November 2015 in the Coupe de France seventh round tie against ES La Rochelle. He scored his side's second goal in a 5–1 victory over the lower-league outfit. On 16 September 2016, Daubin made his first league appearance for Niort, coming on as a late substitute for Jimmy Roye in the 1–1 draw at Troyes AC. He went on to make 17 Ligue 2 appearances during the 2016–17 season.

On 22 June 2017, it was announced that Daubin had joined National 1 side Pau FC on a one-year loan. He joined the club on a permanent basis the following summer.

On 18 June 2022, Daubin signed a two-year contract with Caen.

Career statistics

References

External links
 

Living people
1995 births
Sportspeople from Saint-Nazaire
Association football midfielders
French footballers
Chamois Niortais F.C. players
Pau FC players
Stade Malherbe Caen players
Ligue 2 players
Championnat National players
Footballers from Loire-Atlantique